Arley Ibargüen (born 4 October 1982) is a Colombian javelin thrower.

Personal best
Javelin throw: 81.23 m –  Medellín, 23 April 2016

Competition record

References

External links

1982 births
Living people
Colombian male javelin throwers
South American Games gold medalists for Colombia
South American Games medalists in athletics
Central American and Caribbean Games gold medalists for Colombia
Competitors at the 2014 South American Games
Athletes (track and field) at the 2018 South American Games
Competitors at the 2010 Central American and Caribbean Games
Competitors at the 2014 Central American and Caribbean Games
Competitors at the 2018 Central American and Caribbean Games
Athletes (track and field) at the 2019 Pan American Games
Pan American Games competitors for Colombia
Central American and Caribbean Games medalists in athletics
Ibero-American Championships in Athletics winners
South American Games gold medalists in athletics
People from Apartadó
Sportspeople from Antioquia Department
South American Championships in Athletics winners
20th-century Colombian people
21st-century Colombian people